Eduardo Ovando Martínez (born 13 October 1955) is a Mexican politician affiliated with the Institutional Revolutionary Party. He served as Senator of the LVIII and LIX Legislatures of the Mexican Congress representing Quintana Roo, as a local deputy in the VI Legislature of the Congress of Quintana Roo, and as municipal president of Chetumal between 1999 and 2000.

References

1955 births
Living people
Politicians from Quintana Roo
People from Chetumal, Quintana Roo
Members of the Senate of the Republic (Mexico)
Institutional Revolutionary Party politicians
20th-century Mexican politicians
21st-century Mexican politicians
Members of the Congress of Quintana Roo
Municipal presidents in Quintana Roo